Xulüquanqu was a Chanyu of the Xiongnu Empire. The brother and successor of the Huyandi Chanyu, he reigned from 68 to 60 BC.

In 64 BC, the Xiongnu raided Jiaohe.

Xulüquanqu died in 60 BC and was succeeded by Woyanqudi.

Footnotes

References
Bichurin N.Ya., "Collection of information on peoples in Central Asia in ancient times", vol. 1, Sankt Petersburg, 1851, reprint Moscow-Leningrad, 1950

Taskin B.S., "Materials on Sünnu history", Science, Moscow, 1968, p. 31 (In Russian)

Chanyus
1st-century BC rulers in Asia
60 BC deaths